Darvian-e Olya (also Romanized as Darvīān-e ‘Olyā and Darvīān ‘Olyā; also known as Darreh Veyān-e ‘Olyā, Darreh Veyān-e Sheykh, Darreh Vīān-e ‘Olyā, Darreh Vīān-e Sheykh Aḩmad, Darreh Vīān Sheykh-e Bālā, Darreh Wiyān, Darvīān-e Sheykh Aḩmad, and Qareh Vīān) is a village in Khvor Khvoreh Rural District, Ziviyeh District, Saqqez County, Kurdistan Province, Iran. At the 2006 census, its population was 446, in 81 families. The village is populated by Kurds.

References 

Towns and villages in Saqqez County
Kurdish settlements in Kurdistan Province